This article lists diplomatic missions resident in Croatia. At present, the capital city of Zagreb hosts 56 embassies. Several countries have non-resident embassies accredited from other regional capitals, such as Vienna and Rome.

Embassies 
Zagreb

Gallery

Consular missions

Rijeka 
 (Consular agency)
 (Consulate-General)
 (Consulate-General)

Osijek 
 (Consulates-General)

Split 
 (Consular agency)
 (Consulate)

Vukovar 
 (Consulate-General)

Accredited embassies 
Resident in Vienna unless otherwise noted

 (Andorra la Vella)

 (Budapest)

 (Moscow)
 (The Hague)
 (Geneva)

 (London)

 (Rome)
 (Prague)
 (London)
 (Budapest)
 (Rome)
 (Berlin)

 (Rome)
 (Prague)

 (Budapest)

 (Rome)
 (Rome)
 (Geneva)
 (Berlin)
 (Rome)
 (Valletta)
 (Budapest)
 (Budapest)
 (Rome)
 (Brussels)

 (Rome)
 (Budapest)

 (Bucharest)

 (Sarajevo)
 (Bucharest)

 (Sarajevo)
 (Budapest)
 (Berlin)
 (Rome)
 (Budapest)
 (Bucharest)
 (Berlin)
 (Rome)

 (Budapest)

 (Rome)

Notes

References

External links 
 Missions to Croatia

Diplomatic missions

Croatia